The Saiga-12 is a shotgun available in a wide range of configurations, patterned after the Kalashnikov series of rifles and named after the Saiga antelope native to Russia. Like the Kalashnikov rifle variants, it is a rotating bolt, long-stroke gas piston operated firearm that feeds from a box magazine. All Saiga-12 configurations are recognizable as Kalashnikov-pattern guns by the large lever-safety on the right side of the receiver, the optic mounting rail on the left side of the receiver and the large top-mounted dust cover held in place by the rear of the recoil spring assembly. Saiga firearms are meant for civilian domestic sale in Russia, and export to international markets.

The Saiga-12 is manufactured by the Kalashnikov Concern (the merger of Izhmash and Izhevsk), in Russia. Kalashnikov Concern also manufactures Saiga 20s and Saiga 410s in 20-gauge and .410 bore, as well as the Saiga semi-automatic hunting rifles in a number of centerfire calibers. Russian armed forces use a combat shotgun variant called the KSK (Karabin Spetsialniy Kalahnikov, "Kalashnikov Special Carbine"), with the 12-gauge size expressed in its metric equivalent of 18.5 mm. The Picatinny rail layout is similar to the civilian 030 version.

Modifications to the basic Kalashnikov pattern

The Saiga-12 incorporates several features absent on the Kalashnikov and its derivatives.

Since shotgun shells are nearly twice as wide as 7.62×39mm cartridge, the extraction port in the side of the dust cover had to be increased in size. However, since the bolt had to remain the same length to fit inside the AK-47 sized receiver, the rear section of the bolt is covered by a sliding metal flap that rides on the recoil spring. This allows the gun to be sealed against dirt when the bolt is forward, but the compression of the recoil spring during firing moves the flap rearward to clear the extracted shells.

For the likely reason of simplifying production of Izhmash's other Kalashnikov-pattern guns, the Saiga-12 extractor does not rotate, but instead delegates the bolt-locking function to a caliber-neutral lug directly behind the bolt-face.

The Saiga-12 incorporates an adjustable two-position gas system, with "standard" and "magnum" settings for firing 2-3/4" and 3"-length shells respectively.
This is because firing 3" shells with high power loads such as slugs and buckshot generates so much force that the receiver will be damaged if the full power of the gas system is employed without some sort of recoil buffer. The problem is that making the gun durable with such high power loads would make it more likely to experience a cycle failure with the less powerful 2-3/4" shells and likely not to cycle at all when used with low-powered less lethal ammunition. This would essentially render it a straight-pull mechanism.

Common Saiga 12 configurations

The Saiga-12 is manufactured in several different configurations ranging from more traditional styled hunting models to military-style models utilizing AK or SVD hardware. All these versions are available for purchase by civilians in Russia after applying for a firearms permit.

Civilian barrel lengths are 430 mm and 580 mm (17 and 23 inches). The 580-mm version is standard with a traditional rifle stock or with an AK-style separate pistol grip and folding stock (version S for "skladnaya", "folding"). The 430-mm version (K for "korotkaya", "short") has an AK-style pistol grip and folding stock. The civilian version of the 12K for the Russian domestic market features a specially-designed safety, preventing operation with stock folded (due to Russian gun laws, it is illegal to own a firearm with a barrel length of less than 500 mm and capable of firing while being less than 800 mm long). "Taktika" versions with 580-mm or 430-mm barrels feature various AK, SVD or original "Legion" furniture (handguards, folding and non-folding stocks) and AK-style open sights with high post and tangent rear. Optional screw-in chokes are available. A standard AK rail for optics may be mounted on the left side of the receiver.

Two, five, seven, eight and twelve round box magazines are available, as well as ten, twelve, and twenty round aftermarket drums. All magazines may be interchanged with all 12 gauge models (sometimes minor fitting may be necessary), although factory-original magazines from Russia only exist in 5-, 7- and 8-round box configurations. The magazine configuration is significantly altered compared to more typical Kalashnikov rifles in order to accommodate the larger 12 gauge cartridge.  

Prior to importation to the US, all Saiga shotguns are configured with a traditional fixed "hunting-style" rifle stock and 5-round magazine. Factory 8-round box magazines are not imported in the US (though they are legal for import in other countries), making them quite rare on the civilian market.

Recently, a newly configured version of the Saiga 12 was introduced. Called the Saiga Taktika mod 040, it features an extended magazine well, last round bolt hold open (recently produced very rarely and replaced with manual bolt hold), hinged dust cover with Picatinny rail for mounting optics, picatinny rail gas block, and a newly designed 8-round magazine (not interchangeable with other Saiga-12 models).

This design seems to address deficiencies that the Saiga 12 had in function. The traditional AK "rock and lock" magazine system and the difficulties associated with magazine has been replaced by a vertical insertion system that allow the magazine to be inserted with only one hand. The hinged dustcover with picatinny rail makes mounting optics simpler, and is closer to the bore axis, making sighting of optics easier. The gas-block rail system allows for the addition of combat lights and vertical fore grips. The last round bolt hold open gives the user instant feedback that the firearm is empty and allows for a quicker magazine change.

In late September 2014 the IZ109T was released in the USA. This model featured a shortened barrel with a permanently attached brake. The barrel length was 18 inches (460 mm) including the brake. The IZ109T also had military style features including a rear pistol grip and 6 position stock. Various modifications were made to the trigger group, bolt, and bolt carrier that allowed loaded magazine insertion without locking the bolt back. The IZ109T also featured a fully parkerized military finish.

Variants

The Saiga shotgun is also available in 20-gauge and .410 calibers known as the Saiga-20 and Saiga-410, respectively.

Legal status
In Russia, this shotgun can be relatively simply obtained, requiring only a "smoothbore-gun license" (which is relatively easy to obtain, compared to a "rifle license" that requires a five-year period of owning a smoothbore gun and a hunting permit).

In response to the annexation of Crimea by the Russian Federation, U.S. President Barack Obama issued Executive Order 13662 on July 16, 2014 blocking the importation of all Russia-produced firearms.

Users

  - is allowed as civilian hunting weapon
: - Used By Central Security Forces Special Operations Police 
: Used by counter-terrorist units
: "Saiga-12C" used by the National Anti Narcotics Agency (BNN)
 : certified as a civilian hunting weapon.
 : Used by police forces.
 : "Saiga-12" used by private security companies; 18,5 KS-K carbine adopted by Ministry of Internal Affairs
 : in 2009 "Saiga-12K - Tactical" carbine was adopted by Ukrainian Navy
 : Some US police forces use the Saiga-12 with SWAT teams and Military police units such as the Deployable Specialized Forces in the Coast Guard.

See also
VEPR-12
Armsel Striker
Atchisson Assault Shotgun
Combat shotgun
List of shotguns
NeoStead 2000
SPAS-15
USAS-12
Origin-12
Saiga semi-automatic rifle
List of Russian weaponry

References

Sources
 18,5 мм карабин специальный с коробчатым магазином 18,5КС-К. Руководство по эксплуатации 18,5КС-К РЭ - 2008 г.

External links

Izhmash – official page
Saiga-12.com – more information
Legion USA Inc. – Official Importer of Saiga 12 Shotguns and Rifles

Kalashnikov derivatives
Semi-automatic shotguns of Russia
Izhevsk machine-building plant products
Weapons and ammunition introduced in 1997